Gajender Singh Bisht (1 July 1972 – 28 November 2008) was an NSG commando and Havildar (Sergeant) who was killed during the 2008 Mumbai attacks. His act of bravery was honoured with the Ashoka Chakra award by the President of India on 26 January 2009, India's Republic Day.

Childhood
Hailing from Ganeshpur in Dehradun, Uttarakhand, young Gajender Singh studied at the Janata Inter College in Naya Gaon. He was remembered by his teachers as a disciplined student who participated in every event organised in the school, sports or cultural activities. He had a particular interest in boxing.

Operation Black Tornado

Gajender Singh was a member of the National Security Guard’s 51 Special Action Group. He was part of the team of NSG commandos who were fast-roped onto the roof of Nariman House in an operation to neutralize the terrorists inside who were holding at least six hostages.

According to Jyoti Krishna Dutt, Director General of the NSG, Singh was leading one of the teams that entered the building. The team came under intense fire from the terrorists and returned fire while trying to dominate the situation. The terrorists also hurled several grenades at the commandos. At this point, Singh had the option of retreating with his team. However, he realized that they had to seize this opportunity and continued moving ahead. Rather than turn his back on the militants, he instead created a way for the other commandos despite a grenade thrown at him. Despite sustaining multiple bullet injuries while doing so, he moved forward and ultimately succumbed to his injuries. This enabled his team to secure a dominating position in the encounter.

Death 
While securing the Nariman House during Operation Black Tornado, Singh, a member of the Parachute Regiment was fatally wounded while storming the Jewish centre.

Ashoka Chakra Award Citation

The official citation for the Ashoka Chakra Award reads:

See also
 Hemant Karkare
 Sandeep Unnikrishnan
 Vijay Salaskar
 Ashok Kamte
 Tukaram Omble

References

2008 deaths
Deaths by firearm in India
Terrorism victims in India
Victims of the 2008 Mumbai attacks
Recipients of the Ashoka Chakra (military decoration)
1972 births
Military personnel from Dehradun
Military personnel from Uttarakhand
Ashoka Chakra